Horace Robert Bonser (March 27, 1882 – June 7, 1934) was an American sport shooter who competed in the 1920 Summer Olympics.

In 1920, he won the gold medal as member of the American team in the team clay pigeons competition. He also participated in the Individual trap and finished fifth. He was born, and later died in Cincinnati, Ohio.

References

External links
profile

1882 births
1934 deaths
American male sport shooters
Shooters at the 1920 Summer Olympics
Olympic gold medalists for the United States in shooting
Trap and double trap shooters
Olympic medalists in shooting
Medalists at the 1920 Summer Olympics